The Department of Transport and Regional Development was an Australian government department that existed between March 1996 and October 1998.

Scope
Information about the department's functions and/or government funding allocation could be found in the Administrative Arrangements Orders, the annual Portfolio Budget Statements and in the Department's annual reports.

According to the Administrative Arrangements Order (AAO) made on 11 March 1996, the Department dealt with:
Shipping and marine navigation
Land transport (including road safety)
Civil aviation and air navigation
Aviation security
Regional development

Structure
The Department was administered by Australian public servants who were responsible to the Minister for Transport and Regional Development.

The Secretary of the Department was Allan Hawke.

References

Ministries established in 1996
Transport and Regional Development
Government agencies disestablished in 1998
1996 establishments in Australia
1998 disestablishments in Australia
Defunct transport organisations based in Australia